The 1st Infantry Division (Dutch: 1de Infanterie Divisie) is a Infantry Division of the Belgian Army that fought in the Battle of Belgium against the German Armed Forces.

History

World War I 

At the start of World War I, the 1st Infantry Division was classified as ‘1st Division’, commanded by Lieutenant-General Baix. The headquarters were located at Ghent and the division was composed of the 2nd, 3rd, and 4th Mixed Brigades with limited Cavalry support from the 3rd Lancers Regiment. Artillery units came from the 1st Artillery Regiment.

World War II 
Source:

The 1st Infantry Division was active before mobilization was announced, therefore, the units of the division already had a reconnaissance unit, a transportation unit, and a medical unit, making it one of the most strongest divisions in the entire Belgian Army. The 1st Infantry Division is placed near the Hasselt sector of the Albert Canal.  

The 1st Infantry Division heavily fortified its position when the German attack was confirmed. Yet, the Germans breach the line, and fierce fighting erupts. The 1st Infantry Division had to retreat from the Albert Canal. The 1st Infantry Division was recalled to the K-W line and part of its division(3rd Line Regiment) was sent to the Demer position. 

When recalled for action again, 1st Infantry Division was now responsible of a large section of the K-W line, extending the defenses from Beigem to Nieuwenrode. On May 15, redeployment helped bolster the lines.

On May 16, an unexpected retreat and abandonment of the K-W line by the Allied forces (French 1st Army, and the British Expeditionary Force) forced the Belgians to withdraw, and the 1st Infantry Division was assigned the task of slowing the German advance in the Northern sector while a new defense was being constructed in the south.

The 1st Infantry Division succeeds in their operations and thousands of troops make it to the newly coordinated Terneuzen-Oudenaarde line. But soon, a counterattack by the Germans in the North resulted in threatening the flanks of forces defending the Scheldt Canal, and so, the 1st Infantry Division construct new positions near the town of Sint-Amands. The line was untenable and the Division was pushed to Ghent.

After the encirclement of the Allied forces in Northern France and Flanders, things escalated from bad to worse. The German pressure steadily increased and eventually, Ghent was evacuated. 

The 1st Infantry Division had taken up positions on the new defense in the Korkrijk-Menen sector, and Korkrijk specifically, was heavily reinforced. There was a concern about Menen though. No British forces were ever seen in the city, with only some French Sappers manning the bridges.

In Korkrijk, things developed really badly for the 1st Infantry Division. The German attack heavily deterred the regiments deployed there and after some time, a breach was already made.

The division had to retreat to a new defense by May 26. Only three antitank weapons survived the German attack. Out of all the Infantry Divisions now under the single command of I Corp, the 1st Infantry Division took the most damage, having one mixed battalion left, formed out of only 4 companies. 

This battalion was transferred to 6th Infantry Division, meaning that the 1st Infantry Division is stripped of strength. The remainder of this division will be dissolved following Belgian surrender.

Structure

1914 
After mobilization, 1st division's structure in 1914 was as follows:

 Headquarters, 1st Infantry Division, in Ghent
 1st Administration Company
 Administration Detachment
 Field Telegraph, in Antwerp
 x 2 Gendarmerie Reconnaissance Squadrons, in Bruges and Ghent
 1st Battalion, Carabinier Regiment, in Brussels
 1st Field Artillery Regiment, in Ghent and Antwerp
 1st Company, 1st Engineer Battalion, in Antwerp
 x 1 Engineer Park Section, in Antwerp
 1st Train Company, in Antwerp
 x 2 Infantry Ammunition Columns, in Termonde
 x 2 Artillery Ammunition Column, in Termonde
 Supply Column, in Termonde
 Provisional Equipage Section, in Termonde
 Ambulance Column, in Termonde
 x 2 Field Hospitals
 Remount Depot, in Termonde
 Headquarters, 1st Brigade, in Ghent
 1st Regiment of the Line
 2nd Regiment of the Line, in Ghent and Termonde
 Headquarters, 2nd Brigade, in Bruges
 3rd Regiment of the Line, in Ostend and Ypres
 4th Regiment of the Line

1940 
Structure of the division at the eve of the Battle of Belgium.

•Headquarters, at Hasselt

•Commanding General, 1st Infantry Division -Lieutenant- General Walter Coppens

°3rd Line Regiment

°4th Line Regiment

°24th Line Regiment

°1st Artillery Regiment

°1st Battalion Engineer

°1st Battalion of Transmission Troops

°Cyclists Squadron 1ID(to the 1st Infantry Division)

°2nd Auxiliary Battalion

See also 
Battle of Belgium

Army Group B

14th Infantry Division

K-W Line

References 

Belgian Army soldiers
Battle of Belgium
Military units and formations of Belgium in World War II

Bibliography

 https://18daagseveldtocht.be/